Felix Elofsson (born 30 September 1995) is a Swedish freestyle skier. He competed in the 2018 Winter Olympics.

References

1995 births
Living people
Freestyle skiers at the 2018 Winter Olympics
Freestyle skiers at the 2022 Winter Olympics
Swedish male freestyle skiers
Olympic freestyle skiers of Sweden
21st-century Swedish people